Amr El Gendy Abdelhalim (born 14 June 1991) is an Egyptian basketball player for Al Ahly and .

Career
He played five-years for Gezira. He transferred to Al Ahly in 2020, and played for the Egyptian national team. He was most valuable player at African championship for juniors 2008 and best scorer, and where he participated at the 2014 FIBA Basketball World Cup.

References

External links
Profile at Afrobasket.com

1991 births
Living people
Egyptian men's basketball players
Point guards
Shooting guards
2014 FIBA Basketball World Cup players
Gezira basketball players
Sportspeople from Cairo
Al Ahly basketball players